National conventions in Alpha Phi Omega are biennial gatherings of the respective national organization of the fraternity, in which official business is conducted and brothers from the various chapters in the organization meet to share ideas, expanding leadership, friendship, and service. In the very early years, decisions of the National Fraternity were conducted by mail. The first actual assembly of delegates in a convention was held in St. Louis, Missouri, on March 1–2, 1931. Seven of the fraternity's eighteen chapters were represented at this convention by a total of 23 students and advisors.

Alpha Phi Omega of the United States conducts biennial national conventions in even-numbered years, and as of 2016, forty-four conventions have been held. The last convention held was in Austin, Texas and the next will be held in Phoenix, Arizona.  Conventions were not held in 1942 and 1944 due to World War II, and a special Constitutional Convention was held in 1967. Alpha Phi Omega of the Philippines conducts biennial national conventions in odd-numbered years, and as of 2009, twenty-five conventions have been held.

In the US, national conventions are officially called to order by an opening ceremony in which the Eternal Flame of Service is brought forth by members of the Delta Omega chapter at the University of Houston. This tradition was started after the twenty-first national convention in Dallas, Texas. In the early hours of December 30, 1970, the delegates of the Delta Omega chapter met in a ceremony in the suite of H. Roe Bartle, with the newly elected members of the National Board of Directors and National President Aubrey B. Hamilton. Bartle lit a small blue candle then he in turn used to light a hurricane lamp, which was then passed from the blue candle to each of the board members' candles. He then joined the board members to light two four foot candles. The flame was then taken to Houston and allowed to burn while awaiting the completion of the Eternal Flame site.

Convention attendance has grown considerably through the years. In 1932, there were 88 members attending the convention and the largest convention attendance in the US to date has been 2,316 in New Orleans, Louisiana in 2002, and the largest number of chapters represented was 235 in Philadelphia, Pennsylvania in 2000.

United States 

a. Convention held in September 1926 concurrently with Fifth National Training Conference of Scout Executives.

b.  Conventions were not held during World War II (1942 and 1944). The 1942 Convention was planned for Kansas City,
Missouri and changed by vote of the chapters to a mail ballot at the request of the Office of Defense Transportation (ODT).

c.  The 1967 Constitutional Convention in Norman,
OK is not considered a National Convention, as it was a special conference. Only one delegate per chapter were allowed.

Philippines 

National conventions for Alpha Phi Omega Philippines are biennial gatherings which are currently conducted in odd numbered years. It is where official business is conducted by the General Assembly composed of brothers and sisters from the various chapters and alumni/alumnae associations meeting to share ideas, and to expand leadership, friendship, and service.

d.  1973(?) Convention was temporarily suspended due to the imposition of Martial Law by Philippine President Ferdinand Marcos. Group assembly without approval punishable by incarceration.

References 

National Conventions
Lists of fraternity and sorority national conferences